Church of Santa Eulalia de Ujo is a church in the municipality of Mieres in the community of Asturias, Spain. The church with this name was erected in the 12th century, but it was moved in 1922 to make way for a railroad. Elements of the original Romanesque church, including the main portal and parts of the apse were incorporated into the present church.

See also
Asturian art
Catholic Church in Spain

References

Eulalia de Ujo
12th-century establishments in the Kingdom of León
Romanesque architecture in Asturias
12th-century Roman Catholic church buildings in Spain
Bien de Interés Cultural landmarks in Asturias